Boxhead Pot is a cave on Leck Fell, in Lancashire, England. It leads into the top end of Lost Johns' Cave, and is part of the Three Counties System, an  cave system which spans the borders of Cumbria, Lancashire, and North Yorkshire.

Description

A vertical pipe leads directly onto the top of a  shaft which lands on an unstable boulder ledge.

Geology and hydrology

The cave is a solutional cave formed in Visean Great Scar limestone from the Mississippian Series of the Carboniferous period. Its development has been largely determined by a vertical fault and a number of major joints. The streams that flow through the cave originate from small surface sinks, and are the main source of the water that flows through Lost Johns' Master Cave. It eventually emerges from the Leck Beck Head spring in Ease Gill.

History

The Boxhead Pot shafts were originally climbed from below in the late 1980s by Mick Nunwick. In the autumn of 1994, Northern Cave Club cavers found an open and unstable hole in a shakehole, which they descended to land at the bottom of the NPC Avens in Lost Johns'. The cave was named after Alan Box, a club member who had died in a Spanish cave the previous year. The entrance was stabilised in 1995.

References

Caves of Lancashire
Caves of the Three Counties System